Equity Tower is an office skyscraper at Sudirman Central Business District in South Jakarta, Indonesia. The building has 220 meters of height, 44 floor above & 4 floor below the ground. It was completed in 2010. The tower is designed on the glass facade and an interior that emphasizes on marble slabs. The tower has a multi-functional hall, podium with retail space, food court, ATM gallery and mosque. It has 954 parking slot for vehicles.

See also

Skyscraper design and construction
List of tallest buildings in Jakarta
List of tallest buildings in Indonesia

External links

References

Skyscraper office buildings in Indonesia
Buildings and structures in Jakarta
Office buildings completed in 2010